Winnetonka High School is a high school in the North Kansas City School District.

The school is located at 5815 NE 48 Street in Kansas City North, Missouri. Winnetonka opened in 1971.  Originally built to hold 2,000 students, it now has approximately 1,350. In Fall 2008, some of Winnetonka's students were transferred to the district's new high school, Staley High School, as well as North Kansas City High School due to boundary changes.

Its boundary includes the communities of Birmingham, Claycomo, Pleasant Valley, and Randolph.

Academic programs
Winnetonka currently offers 3 diploma programs:  a basic diploma, a "College Preparation" diploma, and a "Gold Medallion" honors diploma.  Winnetonka also participates in the A+ Program.

Athletics
Competitive Teams Include:

Men's and Women's teams
Soccer
Swimming and Diving
Tennis
Golf
Track and Field
Cross Country
Cheerleading
Volleyball
Men's only
Baseball
Football
Wrestling
Women's only
Softball
Pom/Dance Squad

Extracurricular activities

 International Thespian Society Troupe 422
 48th Street Players Improv Team
 Anime & Gamers Club 
 Creative Writing Club 
 FIRST Robotics Competition Team
 Math Club
 Ace Mentor
 AFS/International Club
 DECA
 FCCLA
 FBLA
 GSA
 Forensics/Debate
 French Club
 German Club
 Spanish Club
 PLM
 Symphonic band- The Winnetonka band played at the famous Carnegie Hall in 2011 and 2008.

Notable alumni
 Scott Speicher, US Navy Captain, first combat casualty of the Persian Gulf War
 Tom Funk, Former MLB player (Houston Astros)

References

External links
Winnetonka High School official website
Symphonic/Marching Band official website
Winnetonka Griffin Football official website

Educational institutions established in 1971
High schools in Kansas City, Missouri
High schools in Clay County, Missouri
Public high schools in Missouri